Evergreen on the Falls, also known as the Snyder-Carroll House, is an historic 19th century home overlooking the Jones Falls valley and located at Baltimore, Maryland, United States. It is a -story, brick mansion in a rural version of the Victorian Italianate style. A serious fire in the early 1970s destroyed the furnishings and most of the interior.  It was built about 1860 and was the home of the supervisor of the Mount Vernon Mills, Albert H. Carroll.  It is headquarters of the Maryland Society for the Prevention of Cruelty to Animals.

Evergreen on the Falls was listed on the National Register of Historic Places in 1975.

References

External links
, including undated photo, at Maryland Historical Trust

Hampden, Baltimore
Houses on the National Register of Historic Places in Baltimore
Houses in Baltimore
Houses completed in 1860
Neoclassical architecture in Maryland
Italianate architecture in Maryland